

Events

January

 January 3
 United States President Dwight D. Eisenhower announces that the United States has severed diplomatic and consular relations with Cuba (Cuba–United States relations are restored in 2015).
 Aero Flight 311 (Koivulahti air disaster): Douglas DC-3C OH-LCC of Finnish airline Aero crashes near Kvevlax (Koivulahti), on approach to Vaasa Airport in Finland, killing all 25 on board, due to pilot error: an investigation finds that the captain and first officer were both exhausted for lack of sleep, and had consumed excessive amounts of alcohol at the time of the crash. It remains the deadliest air disaster to occur in the country.
 January 5
 Italian sculptor Alfredo Fioravanti marches into the U.S. Consulate in Rome, and confesses that he was part of the team that forged the Etruscan terracotta warriors in the Metropolitan Museum of Art.
 After the 1960 military coup, General Cemal Gürsel forms the new government of Turkey (25th government).
 January 7 – Following a four-day conference in Casablanca, five African chiefs of state announce plans for a NATO-type African organization to ensure common defense. The Charter of Casablanca involves the Casablanca Group: Morocco, the United Arab Republic, Ghana, Guinea, and Mali.
 January 8 – In France, a referendum supports Charles de Gaulle's policies on independence for Algeria.
 January 9 – British authorities announce they have uncovered a large Soviet spy ring, the Portland Spy Ring, in London.
 January 17
 President Dwight Eisenhower gives his final State of the Union Address to Congress. In a Farewell Address the same day, he warns of the increasing power of a "military–industrial complex."
 Patrice Lumumba of the Republic of Congo is assassinated.
 January 20 – John F. Kennedy is sworn in as the 35th President of the United States.
 January 24 – A B-52 Stratofortress, with two nuclear bombs, crashes near Goldsboro, North Carolina.
 January 25
 In Washington, D.C., President John F. Kennedy delivers the first live presidential news conference. In it, he announces that the Soviet Union has freed the two surviving crewmen of a USAF RB-47 reconnaissance plane, shot down by Soviet flyers over the Barents Sea on July 1, 1960 (see RB-47H shot down).
 Acting to halt 'leftist excesses', a junta composed of two army officers and four civilians takes over El Salvador, ousting another junta that had ruled for three months.
 January 28 – Supercar, the first family sci-fi TV series filmed in Supermarionation, debuts on ATV in the UK.
 January 30 – President John F. Kennedy delivers his first State of the Union Address.
 January 31 – Ham, a 37-pound (17-kg) male chimpanzee, is rocketed into space aboard Mercury-Redstone 2, in a test of the Project Mercury spacecraft, designed to carry United States astronauts into space.

February

 February 1 – The United States tests its first Minuteman I intercontinental ballistic missile.
 February 4 – The Portuguese Colonial War begins in Angola.
 February 5–9 – In Congo, President Joseph Kasa-Vubu names Joseph Iléo as the new Prime Minister.
 February 9 – The Beatles at The Cavern Club: Lunchtime – The Beatles perform under this name at The Cavern Club for the first time following their return to Liverpool from Hamburg, George Harrison's first appearance at the venue. On March 21 they begin regular performances here.
 February 12 – The USSR launches Venera 1 towards Venus.
 February 13 – The Congo government announces that villagers have killed Patrice Lumumba.
 February 14 – Discovery of the chemical elements: Element 103, Lawrencium, is first synthesized in Berkeley, California.
 February 15
 United States President John F. Kennedy warns the Soviet Union to avoid interfering with the United Nations' pacification of the Congo.
 Sabena Flight 548 crashes near Brussels, Belgium, killing 73, including the entire United States figure skating team and several coaches.
 The total solar eclipse of February 15, 1961, visible in the southern part of Europe, occurs.
 February 26 – Hassan II is pronounced King of Morocco.

March

 March–April – Drilling for Project Mohole is undertaken off the coast of Guadalupe Island, Mexico.
 March 1 – United States President John F. Kennedy establishes the Peace Corps.
 March 3 – Hassan II is crowned King of Morocco.
 March 8
 Max Conrad circumnavigates the earth in 8 days, 18 hours and 49 minutes, setting a new world record.
 The first U.S. Polaris submarines arrive at Holy Loch in Scotland.
 March 11 – "Barbie" gets a boyfriend, when the "Ken" doll is introduced in the United States.
 March 13
 Black and white £5 notes cease to be legal tender in the UK.
 1961 Kurenivka mudslide: A dam bursts in Kiev, USSR, killing 145.
 United States delegate to the United Nations Security Council Adlai Stevenson votes against Portuguese policies in Africa.
 United States President John F. Kennedy proposes a long-term "Alliance for Progress", between the United States and Latin America.
 Cyprus joins the Commonwealth of Nations, becoming the first small country in the Commonwealth.
 Monash University in Melbourne, Australia takes in its first students.
 A second B-52 crashes near Yuba City, California, after cabin pressure is lost and the fuel runs out. Two nuclear weapons are found unexploded.
 March 15
 South Africa announces it will withdraw from the Commonwealth of Nations, upon becoming a republic (31 May). The nation rejoins the organization in 1994.
 The Union of Peoples of Angola, led by Holden Roberto, attacks strategic locations in the north of Angola. These events result in the beginning of the colonial war with Portugal.
 March 18
 A ceasefire takes effect in the Algerian War of Independence.
 Nous les amoureux by Jean-Claude Pascal (music by Jacques Datin, text by Maurice Vidalin) wins the Eurovision Song Contest 1961 for Luxembourg.
 March 29 – The Twenty-third Amendment to the United States Constitution is ratified, allowing residents of Washington, D.C. to vote in presidential elections.
 March 30 – The Single Convention on Narcotic Drugs is signed at New York.

April

 April 5 – The New Guinea Council of Western Papua is installed.
 April 8 – British India Steam Navigation Company passenger ship  blows up and sinks off Dubai; 238 passengers and crew are killed.
 April 11 – The trial of Nazi Adolf Eichmann begins in Jerusalem.
 April 12
 Vostok 1: Soviet cosmonaut Yuri Gagarin becomes the first human in space, orbiting the Earth once before parachuting to the ground.
 Albert Kalonji takes the title Emperor Albert I Kalonji of South Kasai.
 Bernard Schwarz gets the patent for the body electrode.
 April 13 – In Portugal, a coup attempt against António de Oliveira Salazar fails.
 April 17
 The Bay of Pigs Invasion of Cuba begins; it fails by April 19.
 The 33rd Academy Awards ceremony is held in Santa Monica, California: The Apartment (1960) wins most awards, including Best Picture.
 April 18 – Portugal sends its first military reinforcement to Angola.
 April 20 – Fidel Castro announces that the Bay of Pigs Invasion has been defeated.
 April 22 – Algiers putsch: Four French generals who oppose de Gaulle's policies in Algeria fail in a coup attempt.
 April 23 – Judy Garland performs in a legendary comeback concert at Carnegie Hall in New York City.
 April 24 – Swedish warship Vasa, sunk on her maiden voyage in 1628, is recovered from Stockholm Harbor.
 April 27
 President Kennedy urges newspapers to consider national interest in times of struggle against "a monolithic and ruthless conspiracy", in an address before the American Newspaper Publishers Association.
 Sierra Leone becomes independent from the United Kingdom.

May

 May 4 – U.S. Freedom Riders begin interstate bus rides, to test the new U.S. Supreme Court integration decision.
 May 5 – Mercury program: Alan Shepard becomes the first American in space, aboard Mercury-Redstone 3.
 May 6 – Tottenham Hotspur F.C. becomes the first team in the 20th century to win the English league and cup double. , this is the last time Tottenham have won the English League.
 May 8 – Briton George Blake is sentenced to 42 years imprisonment for spying.
 May 9 – In a speech on "Television and the Public Interest" to the National Association of Broadcasters, FCC chairman Newton N. Minow describes commercial television programming as a "vast wasteland".
 May 14 – Civil rights movement: A Freedom Riders bus is fire-bombed near Anniston, Alabama, and the civil rights protestors are beaten by an angry mob of Ku Klux Klan members.
 May 15 – J. Heinrich Matthaei alone performs the Poly-U-Experiment, and is the first person to recognize and understand the genetic code. This is the birthdate of modern genetics.
 May 16 – Park Chung-hee takes over in a military coup, in South Korea.
 May 19 – Venera 1 becomes the first man-made object to fly-by another planet by passing Venus (however, the probe loses contact with Earth a month earlier, and does not send back any data).
 May 21 – Civil rights movement: Alabama Governor John Patterson declares martial law in an attempt to restore order, after race riots break out.
 May 22 – An earthquake rocks New South Wales.
 May 24 – Civil rights movement: Freedom Riders are arrested in Jackson, Mississippi for "disturbing the peace", after disembarking from their bus.
 May 25 – Apollo program: President Kennedy announces, before a special joint session of Congress, his goal to put a man on the Moon before the end of the decade.
 May 27 – Tunku Abdul Rahman, Prime Minister of Malaya, holds a press conference in Singapore, announcing his idea to form the Federation of Malaysia, comprising Malaya, Singapore, Sarawak, Brunei and North Borneo (Sabah).
 May 28 – Peter Benenson's article "The Forgotten Prisoners" is published in several internationally read newspapers. This is later considered the founding of the human rights organization Amnesty International.
 May 30 – Rafael Leónidas Trujillo, ruler of the Dominican Republic since 1930, is killed in an ambush.
 May 31
 In France, rebel generals Maurice Challe and Andre Zelelr are sentenced to 15 years in prison.
 South Africa becomes a republic, and officially leaves the Commonwealth of Nations.
 President John F. Kennedy and Charles de Gaulle meet in Paris.
 Benfica beats Barcelona 3–2 at Wankdorf Stadium, Bern and wins the 1960–61 European Cup (football).

June

 June 1 – Ethiopia experiences its most devastating earthquake of the 20th century, with a magnitude of 6.7. The town of Majete is destroyed, 45% of the houses in Karakore collapse,  of the main road north of Karakore are damaged by landslides and fissures, and 5,000 inhabitants in the area are left homeless.
 June 4 – Vienna summit: John F. Kennedy and Nikita Khrushchev meet during two days in Vienna. They discuss nuclear tests, disarmament and Germany.
 June 16 – Russian ballet dancer Rudolf Nureyev requests asylum in France, while in Paris with the Kirov Ballet.
 June 17
 A Paris-to-Strasbourg train derails near Vitry-le-François; 24 are killed, 109 injured.
 The New Democratic Party of Canada is founded, with the merger of the Cooperative Commonwealth Federation (CCF) and the Canadian Labour Congress.
 June 19 – The British protectorate ends in Kuwait and it becomes an emirate.
 June 22 – Moise Tshombe is released for lack of evidence of his connection to the murder of Patrice Lumumba.
 June 23 – The Antarctic Treaty comes into effect.
 June 25 – Iraqi president Abd al-Karim Qasim announces his intention to annex newly independent Kuwait (such an annexation will occur in 1990).
 June 27 – Kuwait requests British help against the Iraqi threat; the United Kingdom sends in troops.

July

 July 4 – Soviet submarine K-19 suffers a reactor leak in the North Atlantic.
 July 5 – The first Israeli rocket, Shavit 2, is launched.
 July 8 – A mine explosion in Czechoslovakia leaves 108 dead.
 July 12
 A Czechoslovakian Ilyushin Il-18 crashes while attempting to land at Casablanca, Morocco, killing all 72 people on board.
 Two dams that supplied water to the City of Pune, India burst, causing death of more than 1000 residents. 
 July 17 – Baseball legend Ty Cobb dies at the age of 74, at Emory University Hospital.
 July 21 – Mercury program: Virgil I. Grissom, piloting the Mercury-Redstone 4 spacecraft Liberty Bell 7, becomes the second American to go into space (sub-orbital). After splashdown, the hatch prematurely opens, and the spacecraft sinks (it is recovered in 1999).
 July 25 – U.S. President John F. Kennedy gives a widely watched TV speech on the Berlin crisis, warning "we will not be driven out of Berlin." Kennedy urges Americans to build fallout shelters, setting off a four-month debate on civil defense.
 July 31
 At Fenway Park in Boston, the first Major League Baseball All-Star Game tie occurs, when the game is stopped in the 9th inning due to rain (the only tie until 2002).
 Ireland submits the first application from a non-founding country to join the European Economic Community.

August

 August – The United States founds the Alliance for Progress.
 August 1 – The Six Flags Over Texas theme park officially opens to the public.
 August 6 – Vostok 2: Soviet cosmonaut Gherman Titov becomes the second human to orbit the Earth, and the first to be in outer space for more than one day.
 August 7 – Vostok 2 lands in the Soviet Union.
 August 10 – The United Kingdom applies for membership in the European Economic Community.
 August 11 – An annular solar eclipse is visible from the Southern Ocean.
 August 13 – Construction of the Berlin Wall begins, restricting movement between East Berlin and West Berlin, and forming a clear boundary between West Germany and East Germany, Western Europe and Eastern Europe. On August 22 Ida Siekmann jumps from a window in her tenement building trying to flee to the West, becoming the first of at least 138 people to die at the Wall.
 August 21 – Jomo Kenyatta is released from prison in Kenya.
 August 25 – João Goulart replaces Jânio Quadros as President of Brazil (he is ousted in 1964).
 August 30 – The Convention on the Reduction of Statelessness is signed at the United Nations in New York, coming into effect December 13, 1975.

September

 September 1 
 The Eritrean War of Independence officially begins, with the shooting of the Ethiopian police by Hamid Idris Awate.
 The first meeting of the Non-Aligned Movement is held. The Soviet Union resumes nuclear testing, escalating fears over the ongoing Berlin crisis. 
 September 7 – Tom and Jerry make a return with their first cartoon short since 1958, Switchin' Kitten. The new creator, Gene Deitch, makes 12 more Tom and Jerry shorts through 1962.
 September 10 – During the F1 Italian Grand Prix on the circuit of Monza, German Wolfgang von Trips, driving a Ferrari, crashes into a stand, killing 14 spectators and himself.
 September 12 – The African and Malagasy Union is founded.
 September 14 
 The new military government of Turkey sentences 15 members of the previous government to death.
 The Focolare Movement opens its first North American center in New York.
 September 17
 Military rulers in Turkey hang former prime minister Adnan Menderes, together with the former Minister of Foreign Affairs Fatin Rüştü Zorlu and former Minister of Finance Hasan Polatkan.
 The world's first retractable roof stadium, the Civic Arena, opens in Pittsburgh, Pennsylvania.
 September 18 – United Nations Secretary-General Dag Hammarskjöld dies in an air crash, en route to Katanga, Congo.
 September 21 – In France, the OAS slips an anti-de Gaulle message into TV programming.
 September 24
 The old Deutsche Opernhaus in the Berlin neighborhood of Charlottenburg is returned to its newly rebuilt house, as the Deutsche Oper Berlin.
 In the U.S., the Walt Disney anthology television series, renamed Walt Disney's Wonderful World of Color, moves from ABC to NBC after seven years on the air, and begins telecasting its programs in color for the first time. Years later, after Disney's death, the still-on-the-air program will be renamed The Wonderful World of Disney.
 September 28 – A military coup in Damascus, Syria effectively ends the United Arab Republic, the union between Egypt and Syria.
 September 30 – The Organisation for Economic Co-operation and Development (OECD) is formed to replace the Organisation for European Economic Co-operation (OEEC).

October

 October 1 – Baseball player Roger Maris of the New York Yankees hits his 61st home run in the last game of the season, against the Boston Red Sox, setting a new record for the longer baseball season. The record for the shorter season is still held by Babe Ruth.
October 5 – Breakfast at Tiffany's (film) was theatrically released by Paramount Pictures, to critical and commercial success.
 October 10 – A volcanic eruption on Tristan da Cunha causes the whole population to be evacuated to Britain, where they will remain until 1963.
 October 12 – The death penalty is abolished in New Zealand.
 October 17 – Paris massacre of 1961: French police in Paris attack about 30,000 protesting a curfew applied solely to Algerians. The official death toll is 3, but human rights groups claim 240 dead.
 October 18 – West Side Story is released as a film in the United States.
 October 19 – The Arab League takes over protecting Kuwait; the last British troops leave.
 October 25 – The first edition of Private Eye, the British satirical magazine, is published.
 October 26 – Cemal Gürsel becomes the fourth president of Turkey (his former title is head of state and government; he is elected as president by constitutional referendum).
 October 27
 An armistice begins in Katanga, Congo.
 Mongolia and Mauritania join the United Nations.
 Confrontation at Checkpoint Charlie: A standoff between Soviet and American tanks in Berlin, Germany heightens Cold War tensions.
 Fahrettin Özdilek becomes the acting prime minister of Turkey.
 October 29
 DZBB-TV Channel 7, the Philippines' third TV station, is launched.
 Devrim, the first ever car designed and produced in Turkey, is released. The project has been completed in only 130 days almost from scratch, a period including decision on the project, research, design, development and production of four vehicles.
 October 30
 Nuclear weapons testing: The Soviet Union detonates a 58-megaton yield hydrogen bomb known as Tsar Bomba, over Novaya Zemlya (it remains the largest ever man-made explosion).
 The Note Crisis: The Soviet Union issues a diplomatic note to Finland, proposing military co-operation.
 October 31
 Hurricane Hattie devastates Belize City, Belize killing over 270. After the hurricane, the capital moves to the inland city of Belmopan.
 Joseph Stalin's body is removed from the Lenin Mausoleum.

November

 November 1
 The Hungry generation Movement is launched in Calcutta, India.
 The Interstate Commerce Commission's federal order banning segregation at all interstate public facilities officially comes into effect.
 November 2 – Kean opens at Broadway Theater in New York City for 92 performances.
 November 3 – The United Nations General Assembly unanimously elects Burmese diplomat U Thant to the position of acting Secretary-General.
 November 6 – The US government issues a stamp honoring the 100th birthday of James Naismith.
 November 8
 Imperial Airlines Flight 201/8 crashes while attempting to land at Richmond, Virginia, killing 77 people on board.
 KVN, Russia's longest running TV show, airs for the first time on Soviet television.
 November 10 – Catch-22 by Joseph Heller is first published, in the US.
 November 11
 Congolese soldiers murder 13 Italian United Nations pilots.
 Stalingrad is renamed Volgograd.
November 14 – Yves Saint Laurent, a luxury fashion brand of France, founded in Rue La Boetie, Paris. 
 November 17 – Michael Rockefeller, son of New York Governor and later Vice President Nelson Rockefeller, disappears in the jungles of New Guinea.
 November 18 – U.S. President John F. Kennedy sends 18,000 military advisors to South Vietnam.
 November 19 – Rebellion of the Pilots: A military uprising overthrows the Trujillo regime in the Dominican Republic.
 November 20 – İsmet İnönü of the CHP forms the new government of Turkey (26th government, first coalition in Turkey, partner AP).
 November 21 – The "La Ronde" opens in Honolulu, the first revolving restaurant in the United States.
 November 24 – The World Food Programme (WFP) is formed as a temporary United Nations program.
 November 30 – The Soviet Union vetoes Kuwait's application for United Nations membership.

December

 December 1 – Netherlands New Guinea raises the new Morning Star flag, and changes its name to West Papua.
 December 2 – Cold War: In a nationally broadcast speech, Cuban leader Fidel Castro announces he is a Marxist–Leninist, and that Cuba will adopt socialism.
 December 5 – U.S. President John F. Kennedy gives support to the Volta Dam project in Ghana.
 December 9
 Tanganyika gains independence as a Commonwealth realm, with Julius Nyerere as its first Prime Minister, with Queen Elizabeth II as Queen of Tanganyika, and represented locally by the Governor-General of Tanganyika.
 1961 Australian federal election: Robert Menzies' Liberal/Country Coalition Government is re-elected with a one-seat majority, narrowly defeating the Labor Party led by Arthur Calwell. One of the closest election results in Australian history, such a result will not be replicated again until 2016. Notably, former Prime Minister Earle Page loses his seat, although he dies a few days later, never knowing the result.
 December 10 – The Soviet Union severs diplomatic relations with Albania.
 December 11
 American involvement in the Vietnam War officially begins, as the first American helicopters arrive in Saigon, along with 400 U.S. personnel.
 Adolf Eichmann is pronounced guilty of crimes against humanity by a panel of three Israeli judges, and sentenced to death.
 December 14 – Walt Disney's first live-action Technicolor musical, Babes in Toyland, a remake of the famous Victor Herbert operetta, is released, but flops at the box office.
 December 15 – An Israeli war crimes tribunal sentences Adolf Eichmann to death, for his part in The Holocaust.
 December 17 – A circus tent fire in Niterói, Brazil kills 323.
 December 18 – India opens hostilities in its annexation of Portuguese India, the colonies of Goa, Damao and Diu.
 December 19
 The Portuguese surrender Goa to India, after 400 years of Portuguese rule.
 Indonesian president Sukarno announces that he will take West Irian by force, if necessary.
 December 21 – In Congo, Katangan prime minister Moise Tshombe recognizes the Congolese constitution.
 December 23 – Luxembourg's national holiday, the Grand Duke's Official Birthday, is set on June 23 by Grand Ducal decree.
 December 30 – Congolese troops capture Albert Kalonji of South Kasai (who soon escapes).
 December 31 – Ireland's first national television station, Telefís Éireann (later Raidió Teilifís Éireann), begins broadcasting.

Births

 January 

 January 2
 Gabrielle Carteris, American actress, and trade union leader 
 Todd Haynes, American film director
 January 7 – Supriya Pathak, Indian actress
 January 8 – Calvin Smith, American athlete
 January 11
 Lars-Erik Torph, Swedish rally driver (d. 1989)
 Karl Habsburg-Lothringen, Austrian politician, noble 
 January 13 – Julia Louis-Dreyfus, American actress, producer and comedian 
 January 14
 Rob Hall, New Zealand mountaineer (d. 1996) 
 Mike Tramp, Danish rock singer (White Lion)
 January 15 - Leni Wylliams, African-American dancer/choreographer/master-teacher (d. 1996)
 January 17 – Maia Chiburdanidze, Georgian chess player
 January 18
 Peter Beardsley, English footballer 
 Mark Messier, Canadian hockey player
 January 22
 Bentong Kali, Malaysian-Tamil criminal and gangster (d. 1993)
 Daniel Johnston, American singer-songwriter, musician and artist (d. 2019)
 Shigeru Nakahara, Japanese voice actor
 January 24 – Guido Buchwald, German footballer
 January 25 – Vivian Balakrishnan, Singaporean politician
 January 26 – Wayne Gretzky, Canadian hockey player
 January 27 – Saifuddin Abdullah, Malaysian politician
 January 28 – Arnaldur Indriðason, Icelandic writer
 January 29 – Petra Thümer, German swimmer

 February 

 February 1 – Volker Fried, German field hockey player
 February 3 – Jim Balsillie, Canadian CEO and philanthropist
 February 4
 Aleksandr Nikitin, Russian football coach and player (d. 2021)
 Denis Cyr, Canadian-American ice hockey player and politician
 February 5 – Flordelis, Brazilian pastor, singer and politician
 February 6
 Malu Dreyer, German politician
 Yuko Kobayashi, Japanese voice actress
 February 9 – Jussi Lampi, Finnish musician and actor
 February 11 – Mary Docter, American speed skater
 February 12 – David Graeber, American anthropologist, anarchist activist and author (d. 2020)
 February 13 – Henry Rollins, American musician and activist
 February 14 – Maria do Carmo Silveira, Prime Minister of São Tomé and Príncipe
 February 15 – Benoît Chamoux, French alpinist (d. 1995)
 February 16 – Niko Nirvi, Finnish journalist
 February 17
 Meir Kessler, Israeli rabbi
 Andrey Korotayev, Russian anthropologist, economic historian and sociologist
 February 18 – Hironobu Kageyama, Japanese singer
 February 19 – Justin Fashanu, English footballer (d. 1998)
 February 20 
 Dwayne McDuffie, American writer of comics and television (d. 2011)
 Phil Powers, American alpinist
 Imogen Stubbs, British actress and playwright
 February 21
 Christopher Atkins, American actor
 Abhijit Banerjee, Indian-born economist, recipient of the Nobel Memorial Prize in Economic Sciences
 Geoff Moore, American Christian musician
 February 22 – Akira Takasaki, Japanese guitarist
 February 27 – James Worthy, American basketball player and analyst
 February 28
 Mark Latham, Australian politician
 Richard Waugh, Canadian voice actor

 March 

 March 3
 Milorad Mandić, Serbian actor (d. 2016)
 Mary Page Keller, American actress
 John Matteson, Pulitzer Prize-winning American biographer
 March 4
 Ray Mancini, American boxer
 Roger Wessels, South African golfer
 March 5 – Charles Poliquin, Canadian strength coach
 March 9
 Mike Leach, American college football coach
 Rick Steiner, American professional wrestler
 March 10
 Mike Bullard, American hockey player
 Laurel Clark, American astronaut (d. 2003)
 Mitch Gaylord, American gymnast
 March 11 – Elias Koteas, Canadian film and television actor
March 13 - Vasily Ignatenko, Soviet firefighter at the Chernobyl disaster (d. 1986)
March 14
 Kim Boyce, American Christian musician
 Gary Dell'Abate, American radio producer
 Marc Koska, English businessman and inventor
 Hiro Matsushita, Japanese Businessman and Former Racing driver 
 March 16
 Brett Kenny, Australian rugby league player
 Todd McFarlane, Canadian comic book creator and entrepreneur 
 Michiru Ōshima, Japanese composer
 March 17
 Umayya Abu-Hanna, Palestine-born Finnish writer and politician
 Alexander Bard, Swedish musician (Army of Lovers)
 Sam Bowie, American basketball player
 Dana Reeve, American actress, singer and activist (d. 2006)
 Casey Siemaszko, American actor
 March 18
 Tom Emmer, United States House of Representatives Majority Whip, Representative from Minnesota's 6th Congressional District
 March 21 
 Kassie DePaiva, American actress
 Lothar Matthäus, German footballer
 March 22
 Simon Furman, British comic book writer
 March 23 
 Norrie McCathie, Scottish footballer (d. 1996)
 Ali Hewson, Irish activist and businesswoman
 Helmi Johannes, Indonesian television newscaster
 March 24
 Mitsuru Ogata, Japanese voice actor
 Yanis Varoufakis, Greek economist, Greek Finance Minister 
 March 25
 Reggie Fils-Aimé, American businessman
 Vitalijus Satkevičius, Lithuanian politician
 March 26 – William Hague, former UK Foreign Secretary and former Leader of the UK Conservative Party
 March 27 – Tak Matsumoto, Japanese guitarist (B'z)
 March 28 – Byron Scott, American basketball player and coach
 March 29
 Amy Sedaris, American actress, comedian and writer
 Gerardo Teissonniere, Puerto Rican pianist
 March 30 – Doug Wickenheiser, Canadian ice hockey player (d. 1999)
 March 31 – Gary Winick, American filmmaker (d. 2011)

 April 

 April 1
 Susan Boyle, Scottish singer
 Kujira, Japanese voice actress
 April 2 – Christopher Meloni, American actor
 April 3
 Elizabeth Gracen, American beauty queen, actress and model
 Eddie Murphy, African-American actor and comedian
 Edward Highmore, English actor
 April 5 – Lisa Zane, American actress
 April 6 – Gene Eugene, Canadian actor and singer (d. 2000)
 April 7 
 DONDI, American graffiti artist (d. 1998)
 Thurl Bailey, American basketball player
 Daniela Santanchè, Italian politician
 April 9
 Mick Kennedy, Irish footballer (d. 2019)
 April Boy Regino, Filipino musician (d. 2020)
 April 10 – Rudy Dhaenens, Belgian road bicycle racer (d. 1998)
 April 11 – Vincent Gallo, American actor
 April 12 – Lisa Gerrard, Australian musician
 April 14
 Robert Carlyle, Scottish film and television actor
 Neil Dougherty, American basketball coach (d. 2011)
 Humberto Martins, Brazilian actor
 April 15 – Heng Swee Keat, Singaporean politician, Deputy Prime Minister of Singapore
 April 17
 Boomer Esiason, American football player and color commentator
 Greg Gianforte, U.S. Representative from Montana's at large district
 Daphna Kastner, Canadian actress
 April 18 
 Élisabeth Borne, French politician, Prime Minister of France
 Jane Leeves, English actress
 April 20
 Konstantin Lavronenko, Russian actor
 Don Mattingly, American baseball player
 April 21
 John Jairo Arias Tascón 'Pinina', Colombian criminal (d. 1990) 
 Cathy Cavadini, American voice actress
 April 22 – Alo Mattiisen, Estonian musician and composer (d. 1996)
 April 23 
 Dirk Bach, German actor and comedian (d. 2012)
 George Lopez, American actor and comedian
 April 26 
 Mike Francis, Italian singer and composer (d. 2009)
 Anthony Cumia, American radio personality
 April 27 – Moana Pozzi, Italian pornographic actress, television personality and politician (d. 1994)
 April 28 – Futoshi Matsunaga, Japanese serial killer
 April 29 – Fumihiko Tachiki, Japanese voice actor
 April 30 – Isiah Thomas, African-American basketball player, coach and team owner

 May 

 May 2 – Steve James, English snooker player
 May 3 
 Joe Murray, American animator
 David Vitter, U.S. Senator (R-LA)
 May 4
 Jay Aston, British singer (Bucks Fizz)
 Mary Elizabeth McDonough, American actress, producer, director and author
 May 5 – Hiroshi Hase, Japanese professional wrestler
 May 6
 George Clooney, American actor
 Wally Wingert, American actor and voice actor
 Frans Timmermans, Dutch politician and European Commissioner
 May 7 – Robert Spano, American conductor and pianist
 May 8 – Andrea Pollack, East German swimmer (d.2019)
 May 9
 Rene Capo, American judoka (d. 2009)
 John Corbett, American actor and country music singer
 May 10 
 Danny Carey, American drummer (Tool, Pigmy Love Circus)
 Blyth Tait, New Zealand equestrian
 May 11
 Paul Begala, American political commentator
 Lar Park Lincoln, American actress
 May 12 – Billy Duffy, British guitarist (The Cult)
 May 13 – Dennis Rodman, American basketball player and actor
 May 14 
 Urban Priol, German Kabarett artist and comedian
 Tim Roth, English actor and director
May 16
 Solveig Dommartin, French actress (d. 2007)
 Kevin McDonald, Canadian actor, voice actor and comedian
 Charles Wright, American professional wrestler
 May 17 – Enya, Irish musician
 May 18 – Jim Bowden, American baseball executive
 May 20 – Clive Allen, British footballer
 May 21 – Brent Briscoe, American actor and screenwriter (d. 2017)
 May 22 
 Mike Breen, American sports announcer
 Ann Cusack, American actress
 May 23
 Mitar Subotić, Serbian musician and composer (d. 1999) 
 Karen Duffy, American actress
 May 24 – Ilaria Alpi, Italian journalist (d. 1994)
 May 27 – Peri Gilpin, American actress
 May 28 – Roland Gift, British singer and musician (Fine Young Cannibals)
 May 29 – Melissa Etheridge, American musician
 May 30 
 Ralph Carter, American actor
 Harry Enfield, English comedian, actor, writer and director
 May 31
 Ray Cote, Canadian ice hockey player
 Lea Thompson, American actress

June

 June 1
 Paul Coffey, Canadian hockey player
 Dilipkumar Viraji Thakor, Indian politician
 June 2 – Dez Cadena, American musician
 June 3
 Lawrence Lessig, American academic and political activist
 Ed Wynne, English musician (Ozric Tentacles)
 June 4
El DeBarge, American urban singer; was member of American urban group DeBarge
Sam Harris, American actor and pop musician
 June 5
 Mary Kay Bergman, American voice actress (d. 1999)
 Anthony Burger, American musician and singer (d. 2006)
 Rosie Kane, Member of Scottish Parliament
 June 6 – Tom Araya, Chilean-born rock musician (Slayer)
 June 8 – Katy Garbi, Greek singer
 June 9 
 Michael J. Fox, Canadian-American actor, producer and author
 Aaron Sorkin, American screenwriter, producer and playwright
 June 10
 Kim and Kelley Deal, American musicians
 Maxi Priest, born Max Elliott, British reggae singer
 June 12 – Yuri Rozanov, Russian sports TV commentator (d. 2021)
 June 14 – Boy George, born George O'Dowd, British singer-songwriter and music producer
 June 15 – Dave McAuley, Northern Irish boxer
 June 17
 Muslimgauze, British ethnic electronica and experimental musician (d. 1999) 
 Kōichi Yamadera, Japanese voice actor
 June 18
 Sakahoko Nobushige, Japanese sumo wrestler (d. 2019)
 Andrés Galarraga, Venezuelan baseball player
 Alison Moyet, English singer-songwriter
 June 19 – Bidhya Devi Bhandari, 2nd President of Nepal
 June 20 – Karin Kania, German speed skater
 June 21 
 Luis de la Fuente, Spanish football player and coach
Joko Widodo, 7th President of Indonesia
 June 23
 Zoran Janjetov, Serbian comic artist
 David Leavitt, American novelist
 June 24
 Raja Yong Sofia, Malaysian aristocrat
 Lisa Bevill, American Christian musician
 Iain Glen, Scottish actor
 Curt Smith, British singer and keyboardist 
 June 25
 Jamil Khir Baharom, Malaysian politician and former military officer
 Ricky Gervais, English comedian, actor, writer, director, and singer in Seona Dancing
 June 26 – Greg LeMond, American cyclist
 June 27 
 Tim Whitnall, English playwright, screenwriter and actor
 Meera Syal, British-Indian comedian and actress
 June 28
 Jeff Malone, American basketball player
 Eliezer Melamed, Israeli rabbi
 June 29 
 Greg Hetson, American rock guitarist
 Sharon Lawrence, American actress, singer and dancer

July

 July 1
 Diana, Princess of Wales, born The Hon. Diana Spencer, English princess consort as first wife of Charles, Prince of Wales (d. 1997)
 Vito Bratta, American rock guitarist 
 Ivan Kaye, English actor
 Jefferson King, British bodybuilder and wrestler
 Carl Lewis, American athlete
 Fredy Schmidtke, German track cyclist (d. 2017)
 Michelle Wright, Canadian country music artist
 July 2 
 Tetchie Agbayani, Filipina actress
 Jimmy McNichol, American child actor
 Samy Naceri, French actor
 Ram Chiang, Hong Kong actor and singer-composer
 July 3
 Tatiana Aleshina, Russian composer, singer-songwriter, theater artist and poet
 Mosi Alli, Tanzanian sprinter
 Suzanne Dando, English Olympic gymnast
 Joe Moreira, Brazilian jiu-jitsu practitioner and mixed martial artist
 July 4 
 Charles Hector, Malaysian human rights advocate and activist
 Andrew Zimmern, American television personality (Bizarre Foods)
 July 5 – Patrizia Scianca, Italian voice actress
 July 6 
 Richard Mofe-Damijo, Nigerian actor
 Rick Price, Australian singer, songwriter, multi-instrumentalist and record producer
 July 7
 Peter Michael Escovedo, American percussionist and musical director
 Eric Jerome Dickey, American writer
 July 8 
 Toby Keith, American country music singer
 Andy Fletcher, English musician and keyboard player (Depeche Mode) (d. 2022)
 Olaf Johannessen, Faroese stage and actor
 July 9 – Raymond Cruz, American actor
 July 10 
 Jacky Cheung, Hong Kong singer and actor
 Lee Heung-sil, South Korean footballer
 Liyel Imoke, Nigerian politician 
 Killion Munyama, Zambian-Polish economist, academic lecturer and politician
 July 11
 João Donizeti Silvestre, Brazilian businessman, historian, biologist and politician
 Ron Luce, American writer
 Ophir Pines-Paz, Israeli politician
 Sylvester Tung Kiem San, Indonesian bishop
 July 12 – Mark McGann, English actor, director, writer and musician
 July 13 – Stelios Manolas, Greek footballer
 July 14 – Jackie Earle Haley, American actor
 July 15 
 Forest Whitaker, African-American actor and film director
 David Cicilline, American politician
 July 16
 Li Ruiying, Chinese media personality and politician
 J. Alan Brogan, Irish programmer
 July 17
 António Costa, Portuguese politician, 119th Prime Minister (2015–present)
 Jeremy Hardy, English comedian (d. 2019)
 Guru, American rapper (Gang Starr) (d. 2010)
 Zbigniew Zamachowski, Polish actor
 July 18 – Elizabeth McGovern, American actress and musician
 July 19
 Noriyuki Abe, Japanese anime director
 Maria Filatova, Soviet gymnast
 Benoît Mariage, Belgian film director
 Lisa Lampanelli, American stand-up comedian, actress and insult comic
 Campbell Scott, American actor, director, producer and voice artist
 July 21 
 Kenji Haga, Japanese entertainment talent, actor and businessperson
 Mokgweetsi Masisi, 5th President of Botswana
 July 22
 Masumi Hayashi, Japanese serial killer
 Porfirije, born Prvoslav Perić, Serbian Patriarch
 Irina Rozanova, Russian actress
 Keith Sweat, American singer
 July 23
 Martin Gore, British musician and songwriter
 Michael Durant, American military pilot
 Milind Gunaji, Indian actor, model, television show host
 Woody Harrelson, American actor and comedian
 David Kaufman, American actor and voice actor
 July 24 
 Bruno Colmant, Belgian economist and author
 Joseph Kony, Ugandan insurgent, leader of the Lord's Resistance Army
 July 25 
 Katherine Kelly Lang, American actress
 Hugo Teufel III, American lawyer and government official, 2nd Chief Privacy Officer, Department of Homeland Security
 July 26
 Raquel Dodge, General Prosecutor of Brazil
 Gary Cherone, American rock singer-songwriter
 David Heyman, English film producer, founder of Heyday Films
 Keiko Matsui, Japanese pianist and composer
 Dimitris Saravakos, Greek footballer
 July 27
 Ed Orgeron, American football coach
 Erez Tal, Israeli television host
 July 28 
 Mustafa El Haddaoui, Moroccan footballer
 Aleksandr Kurlovich, Soviet-Belarusian Olympic weightlifter (d. 2018)
 July 30 – Laurence Fishburne, African-American actor and film director

August

 August 1 – Danny Blind, Dutch footballer
 August 2 – Pete de Freitas, English musician and producer (d. 1989)
 August 3
 Art Porter Jr., American jazz saxophonist (d. 1996)
 Molly Hagan, American actress
 Nick Harvey, English politician
 August 4
 Pumpuang Duangjan, Thai megastar singer and actress (d. 1992)
 Robin Carnahan, Secretary of State of Missouri
 Barack Obama, 44th President of the United States
 Lauren Tom, American actress and voice artist
 August 5
 Mercedes Aráoz, 1st Vice President of Peru
 Janet McTeer, English actress
 Hishamuddin Hussein, Malaysian politician
 August 7
 Ileen Getz, American actress (d. 2005)
 Brian Conley, English actor, comedian, singer and presenter
 Yelena Davydova, Soviet gymnast
 Maggie Wheeler, American actress
 August 8
 The Edge, Irish rock guitarist (U2)
 Bruce Matthews, American football player
 Rikki Rockett, American rock drummer (Poison)
 August 9
Brad Gilbert, American tennis player
John Key, 38th Prime Minister of New Zealand
 August 10 – Beatrice Alda, American actress and filmmaker
 August 11 
 Suniel Shetty, Indian actor, producer and entrepreneur
 Jukka Tapanimäki, Finnish game programmer (d. 2000)
 August 12 – Lawrence, English musician 
 August 13 
 Mahesh Anand, Indian actor (d. 2019)
 Dawnn Lewis, American voice actress
 Koji Kondo, Japanese video game composer (Nintendo)
 August 14 – Susan Olsen, American actress 
 August 15 – Suhasini Maniratnam, Indian actress
 August 16
 Elpidia Carrillo, Mexican-American actress
 Urara Takano, Japanese voice actress
 August 17 – Uwe Schmitt, German sprinter and hurdler (d. 1995)
 August 18
 Huw Edwards, BAFTA award-winning Welsh journalist and presenter
 Bob Woodruff, American television journalist and activist
 August 19 – Tony Longo, American actor (d. 2015)
 August 20 
 Plamen Nikolov, Bulgarian footballer
 Linda Manz, American actress (d. 2020)
 Manuel Merino, Peruvian politician, 68th President of Peru
 August 21 – Stephen Hillenburg, American marine biologist, cartoonist and animator (d. 2018)
 August 22 – Roland Orzabal, British musician and songwriter
 August 23
 Bhupesh Baghel, Indian politician and current Chief Minister of Chhattisgarh
 Alexandre Desplat, French film composer
 August 24 – Jared Harris, English actor
 August 25
 Billy Ray Cyrus, American actor and singer
 Benjamin Bwalya, Zambian footballer and coach (d. 1999)
 August 27 – Tom Ford, American fashion designer and film director
 August 28 
 Jennifer Coolidge, American actress and comedian
 Deepak Tijori, Indian actor and director
 August 30 – Brian Mitchell, South African boxer
 August 31 – Saleem, Malaysian singer (d. 2018)

September

 September 1 
 Bam Bam Bigelow, American professional wrestler (d. 2007)
 Boney James, American saxophonist, songwriter and record producer
 September 2
 Eugenio Derbez, Mexican actor, comedian and filmmaker
 Carlos Valderrama, Colombian footballer
 Ron Wasserman, American composer
 Anthony Wong Chau-sang, Hong Kong actor
 September 3 
 Andy Griffiths, Australian author
 Iwan Fals, Indonesian singer-songwriter
 Yermi Kaplan, Israeli musician
 September 5 – Marc-André Hamelin, Canadian pianist and composer
 September 6
 Bruce W. Smith, American animator, director and producer
 Paul Waaktaar-Savoy, Norwegian rock musician and songwriter (A-ha)
 September 7 – Kevin Kennedy, British actor
 September 11
 E.G. Daily, American actress, voice actress and singer
 Virginia Madsen, American actress
 September 12 – Mylène Farmer, Canadian singer and songwriter
 September 13 – Dave Mustaine, American singer-songwriter and guitarist 
 September 14 – Martina Gedeck, German actress
 September 15
 Terry Lamb, Australian rugby league player and coach 
 Dan Marino, American football player
 Colin McFarlane, British actor and voice actor
 Lidia Yusupova, Chechen human-rights lawyer
 September 16 – Jen Tolley, American-Canadian actress and singer
 September 17 – Jim Cornette, American author and podcaster
 September 18 – James Gandolfini, American actor and producer (d. 2013)
 September 20 – Lisa Bloom, American lawyer
 September 22
 Bonnie Hunt, American actress, comedian, writer, director and television producer
 Catherine Oxenberg, American actress
 September 23
 Chi McBride, American actor
 William C. McCool, U.S. Navy Commander and astronaut (d. 2003)
 September 24 
 Fiona Corke, Australian actress
 Michael Tavera, American composer
 September 25 
 Heather Locklear, American actress
 Steve Scott, British journalist and presenter
 September 26 – Wes Hopkins, American football player (d. 2018)
 September 27 
 Andy Lau, Hong Kong actor and singer
 Melissa Newman, American artist and singer 
 September 28 
 Yordanka Donkova, Bulgarian athlete
 Wayne Westner, South African golfer (d. 2017)
 September 29 – Julia Gillard, 27th Prime Minister of Australia
 September 30
 Crystal Bernard, American actress and singer
 Gary Coyne, Australian rugby league player
 Eric Stoltz, American actor and director
 Sally Yeh, Hong Kong singer and actress

 October 

 October 1
 Gary Ablett, Australian rules footballer
 Rico Constantino, American professional wrestler
 Michael Righeira, Italian singer-songwriter, musician and actor
 October 3 – Ludger Stühlmeyer, German cantor, composer and musicologist
 October 4
 Philippe Russo, French singer
 Jon Secada, Cuban-American singer-songwriter
 October 5 – Matthew Kauffman, American journalist, George Polk Award winner
 October 6 – Mark Shasha, American artist, author and illustrator
 October 10 – Jodi Benson, American actress and singer
 October 11
 Amr Diab, Egyptian singer
 Steve Young, American football player
 October 12 – Diego García, Spanish long-distance athlete (d. 2001)
 October 13
 Rachel De Thame, English gardener and television presenter
 Doc Rivers, American basketball player and coach
 October 14 – Jim Burns, British science-fiction illustrator 
 October 15 – Meera Sanyal, Indian banker (d. 2019)
 October 16
 Chris Doleman, American football player (d. 2020)
 Scott O'Hara, American pornographic performer, author, poet, editor and publisher (d. 1998)
 Paul Vaessen, English footballer (d. 2001)
 Randy Vasquez, American actor
 Kim Wayans, American actress, comedian, producer, writer and director
 October 18
 Wynton Marsalis, African-American trumpeter and composer
 Rick Moody, American writer
 Gladstone Small, Barbadian-English cricketer 
 October 19 – Cliff Lyons, Australian rugby league player 
 October 20 
 Ian Rush, Welsh footballer
 Les Stroud, Canadian survival expert, filmmaker and musician 
 Michie Tomizawa, Japanese voice actress
 October 22
 Todd Oldham, American designer
 Robert Torti, American actor and singer
 October 24 – Dave Meltzer, American wrestling journalist
 October 25
 Ward Burton, American NASCAR driver
 Pat Sharp, British radio DJ and host
 Chad Smith, American musician
 October 26 – Dylan McDermott, American actor
 October 29 – Randy Jackson, African-American pop singer (The Jackson 5)
 October 30 – Dmitry Muratov, Russian campaigning journalist, recipient of the Nobel Peace Prize
 October 31
 Alonzo Babers, American runner
 Peter Jackson, New Zealand film director
 Larry Mullen, Jr., Irish rock drummer (U2)

November

 November 1
 Anne Donovan, American basketball player and coach (d. 2018)
 Petr Pavel, current President of the Czech Republic
 November 2 
 Sigrid Kaag, Dutch politician and diplomat
 k.d. lang, Canadian singer and songwriter
 November 3 – David Armstrong-Jones, 2nd Earl of Snowdon
 November 4
 Daron Hagen, American composer
 Dominic Heale, British journalist and newsreader 
 Ralph Macchio, American actor
 Jeff Probst, American television personality
 Jerry Sadowitz, American-born British stand-up comic and card magician
 Nigel Worthington, Northern Irish footballer and football manager
 November 5 – Alan G. Poindexter, American astronaut (d. 2012)
 November 9
 Jill Dando, British journalist and television presenter (d. 1999)
 Jackie Kay, Scottish poet and novelist
 November 12 – Nadia Comăneci, Romanian gymnast
 November 14
 Ben Coleman, American basketball player (d. 2019)
 Jurga Ivanauskaitė, Lithuanian writer (d. 2007)
 D. B. Sweeney, American actor
 November 16
 Andrea Prodan, Scottish-Italian film actor, composer and musician 
 Corinne Hermès, French singer, Eurovision Song Contest 1983 winner
 November 18
 Michael Hawley, American academic and artist (d. 2020)
 Steven Moffat, Scottish screenwriter
 Anthony Warlow, Australian singer
 November 19 – Meg Ryan, American actress and film director
 November 20 – Dave Watson, English footballer
 November 21 – Maria Kawamura, Japanese voice actress
 November 22
 Mariel Hemingway, American actress
 Stephen Hough, British-Australian pianist
 Randal L. Schwartz, American computer programmer
 November 24 – Arundhati Roy, Indian writer and activist
 November 25 – Matthias Freihof, German television actor and director
 November 28 – Alfonso Cuarón, Mexican film director, screenwriter and producer
 November 29
 Kim Delaney, American actress
 Tom Sizemore, American actor (d. 2023)

December

 December 1 – Salahuddin Ayub, Malaysian politician
 December 3 – Marcelo Fromer, Brazilian guitarist
 December 4
 Rocky Dennis, American teenager who had craniodiaphyseal dysplasia (d. 1978)
 Frank Reich, American football player
 December 5
 Alan Davies, English-Welsh international footballer (d. 1992)
 Laura Flanders, British born American journalist
 December 6 - Colin Salmon, British actor 
December 8 – Ann Coulter, American author, conservative commentator and attorney
 December 9 
 Beril Dedeoğlu, Turkish politician and academic (d. 2019)
 David Anthony Higgins, American actor
 December 10
 Pasang Lhamu Sherpa, Nepalese Buddhist (d. 1993) 
 Nia Peeples, American actress
 December 12
 Daniel O'Donnell, Irish singer
 Sarah Sutton, British actress
 December 13
Karen Witter, American actress and model
Per Øystein Sørensen, Norwegian lead singer Fra Lippo Lippi
 December 15 – Karin Resetarits, Austrian journalist and politician
 December 16
 Bill Hicks, American comedian (d. 1994)
 Jon Tenney, American actor
 Sam Robards, American actor
 Shane Black, American film director
 December 19
 Eric Allin Cornell, American physicist, Nobel Prize laureate
 Matthew Waterhouse, British actor
 Reggie White, American football player (d. 2004)
 December 20 – Mohammad Fouad, Arab singer and actor
 December 21 – Francis Ng, Hong Kong actor
 December 22 – Kassim Majaliwa, 10th Prime Minister of Tanzania
 December 23 
 Ezzat el Kamhawi, Egyptian novelist
 George Wassouf, Syrian singer
 December 24 
 Ilham Aliyev, 7th Prime Minister of Azerbaijan and 4th President of Azerbaijan
 Wade Williams, American actor
 December 25
 Íngrid Betancourt, Colombian senator
 Ghislaine Maxwell, British socialite
 David Thompson, 6th Prime Minister of Barbados (d. 2010)
 December 26 – John Lynch, Northern Irish actor
 December 27 – Guido Westerwelle, German politician (d. 2016)
 December 29 – Jim Reid, Scottish musician
 December 30
 Douglas Coupland, Canadian author
 Bill English, 39th Prime Minister of New Zealand
 Sean Hannity, American radio/television host and conservative commentator
 Ben Johnson, Canadian athlete
December 31 – Aziz Akhannouch, Moroccan politician, Prime Minister of Morocco

Deaths

January
 January 3 – Auvergne Doherty, Australian businesswoman (b. 1896)
 January 4 – Erwin Schrödinger, Austrian physicist, Nobel Prize laureate (b. 1887)
 January 8 – František Flos, Czech novelist (b. 1864)
 January 9 – Emily Greene Balch, American writer and pacifist, recipient of the Nobel Peace Prize (b. 1867)
 January 10 – Dashiell Hammett, American writer (b. 1894)
 January 13 
 Nino Marchesini, Italian actor (b. 1895)
 Blanche Ring, American singer and actress (b. 1871)
 January 14 – Barry Fitzgerald, Irish actor (b. 1888)
 January 17 – Patrice Lumumba, 1st Prime Minister of the Democratic Republic of the Congo (b. 1925)
 January 18 – Thomas Anthony Dooley III, physician (b. 1927)
 January 21 
 Blaise Cendrars, Swiss writer (b. 1887)
 John J. Becker, American composer and pianist (b. 1886)
 January 24 – Alfred Carlton Gilbert, American swimmer and inventor (b. 1884)
 January 26 – Stan Nichols, English cricketer (b. 1900)
 January 29 – Jesse Wallace, American naval officer, 29th Governor of American Samoa (b. 1899)
 January 30 – Dorothy Thompson, American journalist (b. 1893)

February
 February 2 – Anna May Wong, Chinese-American actress (b. 1905)
 February 3 – Viscount Dunrossil, Australian Governor-General (b. 1893)
 February 4 
 Hazel Heald, American writer (b. 1896)
 Sir Philip Game, British army officer, colonial governor and police officer (b. 1876)
 February 6 – Lawrence Dundas, 2nd Marquess of Zetland, British politician (b. 1876)
 February 7 – William Duncan, American actor (b. 1879)
 February 9 – Carlos Luz, Brazilian politician, 19th President of Brazil (b. 1894)
 February 12 – Richmond K. Turner, American admiral (b. 1885)
 February 13 – Arthur Ripley, American film director (b. 1897)
 February 15 – Laurence Owen, American figure skater (b. 1944)
 February 16 – Dazzy Vance, American baseball player (Brooklyn Dodgers) and a member of the MLB Hall of Fame (b. 1891)
 February 17 
 Horatio Berney-Filkin, British army general (b. 1892)
 Nita Naldi, American actress (b. 1894)
 February 20 – Percy Grainger, Australian composer (b. 1882)
 February 22
 George de Cuevas, Chilean-American ballet impresario and choreographer (b. 1885)
 Nick LaRocca, American jazz musician (b. 1889)
 February 26
 Uberto De Morpurgo, Italian tennis player (b. 1896)
 King Mohammed V of Morocco (b. 1909)
 February 28 – Aaron S. "Tip" Merrill, American admiral (b. 1890)

March
 March 3
 Azizul Haq, Bengali Islamic scholar (b. 1903)
 Paul Wittgenstein, Austrian-born pianist (b. 1887)
 March 6 
 George Formby, British singer, comedian and actor (b. 1904)
 Oswald Rayner, British MI6 agent (b. 1888)
 March 8
 Sir Thomas Beecham, English conductor (b. 1879)
 Gala Galaction, Romanian writer (b. 1879)
 March 12
 Victor d'Arcy, British Olympic athlete (b. 1887)
 Belinda Lee, English actress (b. 1935)
 March 17 – Susanna M. Salter, first woman mayor in the United States (b. 1860)
 March 22 – Nikolai Massalitinov, Soviet-born Bulgarian actor (b. 1880)
 March 23 – Valentin Bondarenko, Russian cosmonaut (b. 1937)
 March 25 – Arthur Drewry, English administrator, 5th President of FIFA (b. 1891)
 March 26 – Carlos Duarte Costa, Brazilian Roman Catholic archbishop and saint, founder of the Brazilian Catholic Apostolic Church (b. 1888)

April
 April 2 – Wallingford Riegger, American music composer (b. 1885)
 April 3 – Eliseo Mouriño, Argentine footballer (b. 1927)
 April 6 – Jules Bordet, Belgian immunologist and microbiologist, recipient of the Nobel Prize in Physiology or Medicine (b. 1870)
 April 7 
 Vanessa Bell, English artist and interior designer (b. 1879)
 Jesús Guridi, Spanish Basque composer (b. 1886)
 Marian Driscoll Jordan, American actress and radio personality (b. 1898)
 April 9 – Ahmet Zog/Zog I, Skanderberg III, Albanian political leader, 11th Prime Minister of Albania, 7th President of Albania and King of Albania (b. 1895)
 April 10 – Sir John Hope Simpson, British politician (b. 1868)
 April 11 – Padma Shumsher Jang Bahadur Rana, 16th Prime Minister of Nepal (b. 1882)
 April 12 
 Mbarek Bekkay, 1st Prime Minister of Morocco (b. 1907)
 Aziz Ezzat Pasha, Egyptian politician (b. 1869)
 April 19 – Manuel Quiroga, Spanish violinist (b. 1892)
 April 21 – James Melton, American tenor (b. 1904)
 April 24 – Lee Moran, American actor (b. 1888)
 April 25
 Robert Garrett, American Olympic athlete (b. 1875)
 George Melford, American actor (b. 1877)
 April 27
 Roy Del Ruth, American film director (b. 1893)
 Minoru Sasaki, Japanese general (b. 1893)
 April 30
 Dickie Dale, English motorcycle road racer (b. 1927)
 Jessie Redmon Fauset, American editor, writer and educator (b. 1882)

May
 May 3
 Lajos Dinnyés, 41st Prime Minister of Hungary (b. 1901)
 Maurice Merleau-Ponty, French phenomenological philosopher (b. 1908)
 May 6 – Lucian Blaga, Romanian poet and philosopher (b. 1895)
 May 13 – Gary Cooper, American actor (High Noon) (b. 1901)
 May 14 – Albert Sévigny, Canadian politician (b. 1881)
 May 16 – George A. Malcolm, American jurist and educator (b. 1881)
 May 22 – Joan Davis, American actress (b. 1912)
 May 30 – Rafael Trujillo, Dominican politician and soldier, 2-time President of the Dominican Republic (b. 1891)

June
 June – Constantin Constantinescu-Claps, Romanian general (b. 1884)
 June 6 – Carl Jung, Swiss psychiatrist (b. 1875)
 June 9 – Camille Guérin, French bacteriologist and immunologist (b. 1872)
 June 14 – Eddie Polo, Austrian-American actor (b. 1875)
 June 16 – Marcel Junod, Swiss physician (b. 1904)
 June 17
 Jeff Chandler, American actor (b. 1918)
 Thomas Darden, American Rear admiral, 37th Governor of American Samoa (b. 1900)
 June 18 – Eddie Gaedel, American with dwarfism (b. 1925)
 June 19 – Sir Richard Turner, Canadian general, Victoria Cross recipient (b. 1871)
 June 23 – Nikolai Malko, Soviet conductor (b. 1883)
 June 24
 William J. Connors, American politician (b. 1891) 
 George Washington Vanderbilt III, American philanthropist (b. 1914)
 June 25 – John Alexander Douglas McCurdy, Lieutenant Governor of Nova Scotia and pilot (b. 1886)
 June 27 
 Paul Guilfoyle, American actor (b. 1902)
 Mukhtar Auezov, Kazakh writer (b. 1897)
 June 30 – Lee de Forest, American inventor (b. 1873)

July
 July 1 
 Nasuhi al-Bukhari, Syrian soldier and politician, 12th Prime Minister of Syria (b. 1881)
 Louis-Ferdinand Céline, French writer (b. 1894)
 July 2 – Ernest Hemingway, American writer, Nobel Prize laureate (suicide) (b. 1899)
 July 4 – Franklyn Farnum, American actor (b. 1878)
 July 6
 Konstantinos Logothetopoulos, Prime Minister of Greece (b. 1878)
 Woodall Rodgers, American politician, 43rd Mayor of Dallas (b. 1890)
 July 9 – Whittaker Chambers, American spy and witness in Hiss case
 July 15 – Nina Bari, Russian mathematician (b. 1901)
 July 17 – Ty Cobb, American baseball player and a member of the Baseball Hall of Fame (b. 1886)
 July 23
 Esther Dale, American actress (b. 1885)
 Valentine Davies, American screenwriter (b. 1905)
 Princess Teru of Japan (b. 1925)
 July 28 – Harry Gribbon, American actor of silent films (b. 1885)
 July 30 – Sediqeh Dowlatabadi, Persian feminist, women's rights activist and journalist (b. 1882)

August
 August 1 – Domingo Pérez Cáceres, Spanish Roman Catholic priest and saint (b. 1892)
 August 4
 Zoltán Tildy, 39th Prime Minister of Hungary (b. 1889)
 Maurice Tourneur, French film director (b. 1873)
 August 5 – Sidney Holland, New Zealand politician, 25th Prime Minister of New Zealand (b. 1893)
 August 8 – Mei Lanfang, Beijing opera star (b. 1894)
 August 9 – Walter Bedell Smith, American general and diplomat (b. 1895)
 August 11 – William Jackson, American gangster (b. 1920)
 August 14 
 Henri Breuil, French priest, archaeologist, anthropologist and ethnologist (b. 1877)
 Clark Ashton Smith, American writer and sculptor (b. 1893)
 August 20 – Percy Williams Bridgman, American physicist, Nobel Prize laureate (b. 1882)
 August 23 – Beals Wright, American tennis player (b. 1879)
 August 26
 Howard P. Robertson, American physicist (b. 1903)
 Gail Russell, American actress (b. 1924)
 August 30
 Charles Coburn, American actor (b. 1877)
 Cristóbal de Losada y Puga, Peruvian mathematician and mining engineer (b. 1894)

September
 September 1 – Eero Saarinen, Finnish architect (b. 1910)
 September 3 
 Richard Mason, British explorer (b. 1934)
 September 4 – Charles D.B. King, President of Liberia from 1920 to 1930 (b. 1875) 
 September 7 – Pieter Gerbrandy, Prime Minister of the Netherlands 1940 to 1945 (b. 1885)
 September 16 
 Percy Chapman, English cricketer (b. 1900)
 Hasan Fehmi, Turkish politician (b. 1879)
 September 17 
 Miguel Gómez Bao, Spanish-born Argentine actor (b. 1894)
 Adnan Menderes, Turkish statesman, 9th Prime Minister of Turkey (executed) (b. 1899)
 September 18
 Dag Hammarskjöld, Swedish diplomat, politician and author, 2nd Secretary General of the United Nations, recipient of the Nobel Peace Prize (b. 1905)
 September 21 – Georgia Ann Robinson, community worker and first African American woman to be appointed a Los Angeles police officer (b. 1879)
 September 22 – Marion Davies, American actress (b. 1897)
 September 23 – Elmer Diktonius, Finnish poet and composer (b. 1896)
 September 24 – Sumner Welles, American diplomat (b. 1892)
 September 25 – Frank Fay, American vaudeville comedian and film and stage actor (b. 1891)
 September 26
 Robert L. Eichelberger, American general (b. 1886)
 Juanita Hansen, American actress (b. 1895)
 September 27 – H.D. (Hilda Doolittle), American poet and novelist (b. 1886)

October
 October 1 – Donald Cook, American actor (b. 1901)
 October 2 – Essington Lewis, Australian industrialist (b. 1881)
 October 4 – Max Weber, Polish-American artist (b. 1881)
 October 6 – J. Reuben Clark, American politician and Mormon leader (b. 1871)
 October 11
 Lucy Tayiah Eads, Kaw tribal chief (b. 1888)
 Chico Marx, American comedian (b. 1887)
 October 13
 Louis Rwagasore, 2nd Prime Minister of Burundi (assassinated) (b. 1932)
 Maya Deren, Russian-born American filmmaker (b. 1917)
 Zoltán Korda, Hungarian screenwriter and director (b. 1895)
 Dun Karm Psaila, Maltese writer (b. 1871)
 October 14
 Paul Ramadier, French politician, 63rd Prime Minister of France (b. 1888)
 Harriet Shaw Weaver, English political activist (b. 1876)
 October 19
 Şemsettin Günaltay, Turkish historian and politician, 8th Prime Minister of Turkey (b. 1883)
 Sergio Osmeña, Filipino politician, 4th President of the Philippines (b. 1878)
 October 21 – Karl Korsch, German Marxist theoretician (b. 1886)
 October 22 
 Joseph M. Schenck, Russian-born film studio executive (b. 1878)
 Aloys Van de Vyvere, 25th Prime Minister of Belgium (b. 1871)
 October 26 – Milan Stojadinović, 12th Prime Minister of Yugoslavia (b. 1888)
 October 30 – Luigi Einaudi, Italian economist and politician, 2nd President of Italy (b. 1874)
 October 31 – Augustus John, Welsh painter (b. 1878)

November
 November 1 – Mordecai Ham, American evangelist (b. 1877)
 November 2 
 James Thurber, American humorist (b. 1894)
 Salman bin Hamad Al Khalifa I, 12th Hakim of Bahrain (b. 1894)
 November 3 – Thomas Flynn, British Roman Catholic prelate and reverend (b. 1880)
 November 9 – Ferdinand Bie, Norwegian Olympic athlete (b. 1888)
 November 15
 Elsie Ferguson, American actress (b. 1883)
 Johanna Westerdijk, Dutch plant pathologist (b. 1883)
 November 16 – Sam Rayburn, Speaker of the United States House of Representatives (b. 1882)
 November 22 – Anselmo Alliegro y Milá, Cuban politician, 3rd Prime Minister of Cuba, leader of World War II (b. 1899)
 November 24 – Ruth Chatterton, American actress, novelist and aviator (b. 1892)
 November 25 – Adelina de Lara, British composer (b. 1872)
 November 30 – Anna Gould, American heiress and socialite, daughter of financier Jay Gould (b. 1875)

December
 December 2 – Dulcie Mary Pillers, English medical illustrator (b. 1891)
 December 3 – Pat O'Hara Wood, Australian tennis player (b. 1891)
 December 6 – Frantz Fanon, Martiniquais philosopher (b. 1925)
 December 10 – Elwyn Welch, New Zealand farmer, ornithologist, conservationist and Open Brethren missionary (b. 1925)
 December 13 – Anna Mary Robertson Moses aka Grandma Moses, American naïve painter (b. 1860)
 December 15 – Gioacchino Failla, Italian-born American physicist (b. 1891)
 December 20
 Moss Hart, American dramatist (b. 1904)
 Sir Earle Page, Australian politician, 11th Prime Minister of Australia (b. 1880)
 December 22 – Dick Elliott, American actor (b. 1886)
 December 23 
 Kurt Meyer, German Generalmajor der Waffen-SS'' and war criminal (b. 1910)
 Fanny Schoonheyt, Dutch Communist Lieutenant in the Spanish Civil War. (b. 1912)
 December 25 – Otto Loewi, German-born pharmacologist, recipient of the Nobel Prize in Physiology or Medicine (b. 1873)
 December 27 – Bernard McConville, American screenwriter (b. 1887)
 December 28 – Edith Wilson, First Lady of the United States from 1915 to 1921 (b. 1872)
 December 29
 Anton Flettner, German aviation engineer and inventor (b. 1885)
 Sibyl Morrison, first female barrister in New South Wales, Australia (b. 1895)

Nobel Prizes

 Physics – Robert Hofstadter, Rudolf Mössbauer
 Chemistry – Melvin Calvin
 Physiology or Medicine – Georg von Békésy
 Literature – Ivo Andrić
 Peace – Dag Hammarskjöld (posthumously)

See also 

 Upside down year

References